Rudolf William Mosbergen (8 April 1929 – 22 February 2015) was a Singaporean field hockey player. He competed in the men's tournament at the 1956 Summer Olympics.

He studied at St Joseph's Institution and graduated with the Class of 1948. He was the founding principal of Raffles Junior College (1982-1987).

References

External links
 
 

1929 births
2015 deaths
Singaporean male field hockey players
Olympic field hockey players of Singapore
Field hockey players at the 1956 Summer Olympics
Saint Joseph's Institution, Singapore alumni
20th-century Singaporean people